The 2005–06 Dayton Flyers men's basketball team represented the University of Dayton during the 2005–06 NCAA Division I men's basketball season. The Flyers, led by third year head coach Brian Gregory, played their home games at the University of Dayton Arena and were members of the Atlantic 10 Conference. They finished the season 14–17, 6–10 in A-10 play, their first losing season since 1998-99 and currently the last time the program finished with a losing record. The Flyers started the season 8-3, including a win at Cincinnati, the program's first win on their rivals home court since 1984, before losing 7 games in a row. The Flyers lost to Saint Joseph's in the first round of the Atlantic 10 tournament. Dayton was not selected to play in a postseason tournament, the 2nd season in a row that the Flyers did not play in a postseason tournament.

Previous season
The 2004–05 Dayton Flyers finished the season 18–11, with a record of 10-6 in the Atlantic 10 regular season. The Flyers season ended in the quarterfinals of the 2005 Atlantic 10 men's basketball tournament against Temple.

Incoming recruits

Roster

Schedule

|-
!colspan=9 style="background:#C40023; color:#75B2DD;"| Exhibition

|-
!colspan=9 style="background:#C40023; color:#75B2DD;"| Non-conference regular season

|-
!colspan=9 style="background:#C40023; color:#75B2DD;"| Atlantic 10 regular season

|-
!colspan=9 style="background:#C40023; color:#75B2DD;"| Atlantic 10 tournament

References

Dayton Flyers men's basketball seasons
Dayton
Dayton
Dayton